Hartley Peavey  (born December 30, 1941) is an American entrepreneur who is the founder and CEO of Peavey Electronics Corporation, a musical equipment innovation and production company. A 1964 graduate of Mississippi State University, Peavey has been recognized by his alma mater as an Alumni Fellow and as the 2004 commencement speaker.  He also received an honorary doctor of creative and performing arts degree from Mississippi State in 2004.

Hartley Peavey founded Peavey Electronics, one of the world's largest manufacturers and suppliers of musical and professional audio equipment, in 1964 after building his first amplifier in 1956. Since its foundation, Peavey Electronics has been privately owned, and has grown massively from their humble beginnings in Hartley's basement in the 1950s.

Awards and honors 

 2003: Honored by the City of Meridian, Mississippi, with "Hartley Peavey Drive"
 2001: Inducted into the Mississippi Musicians Hall of Fame (
 1996: Profiled by CNN and featured in international print ad campaign in Forbes, The Economist, BusinessWeek and Money
 1991: Honored by the President of the United States, George H. W. Bush, for workplace training, education and achievements in the international marketplace
 1990: Inducted into Rock Walk of Fame, Hollywood, California

Notes

References

External links
 Video Interview with Hartley Peavey
 Video Interview with Hartley Peavey at 2011 NAMM Show by The Musician Network®
Hartley Peavey NAMM Oral History Program Interview (2002, 2014)

Living people
1939 births
People from Meridian, Mississippi
American musical instrument makers
Mississippi State University alumni